is a Japanese former swimmer. He competed in the men's 100 metre backstroke at the 1952 Summer Olympics.

References

External links
 

1932 births
Living people
Olympic swimmers of Japan
Swimmers at the 1952 Summer Olympics
Place of birth missing (living people)
Asian Games medalists in swimming
Asian Games silver medalists for Japan
Swimmers at the 1954 Asian Games
Medalists at the 1954 Asian Games
Japanese male backstroke swimmers
20th-century Japanese people